The 2012–13 Croatian Football Cup was the twenty-second season of Croatia's football knockout competition. The defending champions were Dinamo Zagreb, having won their 12th title the previous year by defeating Osijek in the final.

The cup kicked off with the single-legged preliminary round which was scheduled on 29 August 2012. Most of the top flight clubs entered the competition in the following round, scheduled on 26 September 2012, with the exception of Lokomotiva, RNK Split and Zadar, as their cup coefficient (determined by their cup record over the last five seasons) was too low to skip the preliminary round.

Calendar

Preliminary round
The draw for the preliminary round was held on 1 August 2012 with matches scheduled on 29 August 2012. This round consists of 16 single-legged fixtures. A total of 32 clubs entered the preliminary round: 21 regional cup winners organized at the county level and 11 regional cup finalists (from the top 11 counties with the greatest number of registered football clubs).

* Match played on 28 August.

First round
First round proper consisted of 16 single-legged matches, with 16 winners of the preliminary round joined by 16 clubs with the highest cup coefficients (including remaining nine top level clubs). The draw for the first round was held on 30 August, where the club with the lowest cup coefficient hosts the one with the highest and so on. Matches are scheduled on 26 September 2012.

* Match played on 25 September

Second round
The second round will be contested by 16 winners from the first round in eight single-legged fixtures scheduled for 31 October 2012. It will be the last stage of the competition employing the single leg format as from the quarter-finals onwards all fixtures are going to be double-legged events.

* Match played on 30 October

Quarter-finals
The eight clubs remaining in the competition after the second round were paired for the quarter-finals. From the quarter-finals onwards the ties will be played in a two-legged format. The draw was held on 7 November 2012.

|}

Semi-finals

First legs

Second legs

Lokomotiva won 4–1 on aggregate

Hajduk Split won 3–2 on aggregate

Notes

Final

First leg

Second leg

Hajduk Split won 5–4 on aggregate

See also
2012–13 Croatian First Football League
2012–13 Croatian Second Football League

References

External links
Official website 

Croatian Football Cup seasons
Croatia
Croatian Cup, 2012-13